Abiromorphus is a genus of leaf beetles in the subfamily Eumolpinae that are found in eastern Asia. It was first described by the French entomologist Maurice Pic in 1924 for a single species from China. It is similar to Abirus, and is distinguished by simple tarsal claws and thick femurs.

Species
 Abiromorphus anceyi Pic, 1924 – China (Jiangsu, Jilin, Zhejiang), North Korea, South Korea, Russia (Far East)
 Abiromorphus vietnamicus Medvedev, 2015 – Northern Vietnam (Cao Bằng Province)

References

Eumolpinae
Chrysomelidae genera
Beetles of Asia
Taxa named by Maurice Pic